The Devil's Teeth: A True Story of Obsession and Survival Among America's Great White Sharks is a non-fiction book about great white sharks by American journalist Susan Casey. The text was initially published by Henry Holt and Company on June 7, 2005. The book became a widely acclaimed bestseller.

Overview
Susan Casey, a journalist and ocean lover, became infatuated with great white sharks of the Farallon Islands—dubbed by sailors in the 1850s the "devil's teeth." The sharks there are the alphas among alphas, some longer than twenty feet, and they congregate just twenty-seven miles off the coast of San Francisco. After going through many restrictions and barriers, she manages to join a group of scientists studying predation patterns by great white sharks within the so-called Red Triangle.

Commentary

Bestselling list
New York Times bestseller
San Francisco Chronicle bestseller
Book Sense bestseller and selection
2005 NPR Summer Reading selection
Men’s Journal Top-10 Read
Barnes & Noble Discover selection

References

Sources

External links

Excerpt: The Devil's Teeth

2005 non-fiction books
American non-fiction books
Biology books
Sharks